Staten is an unincorporated community in Calhoun County, in the U.S. state of West Virginia.

History
A post office called Staten was established in 1888, and remained in operation until 1966. The community was named after Staten Island, New York.

References

Unincorporated communities in Calhoun County, West Virginia
Unincorporated communities in West Virginia